The Snake River Archaeological District is an archaeological area located in Nez Perce County, Idaho, and Asotin County, Washington, and centered on the Snake River, which divides the two states. The area includes a number of sites inhabited by the Nez Perce people, who used it as a fishing ground and a winter campsite. Settlement in the area stretches from roughly 6000 B.C. to the 20th century A.D. Several hundred pictographs are part of the area, usually painted at village sites.

It includes the confluence of Redbird Creek and the Snake River.

The Washington part of the site, west of Snake River and comprising  in Asotin County, Washington was added as the Snake River Archeological District to the National Register in 1976.

The Idaho part of the site, east of Snake River and comprising  in Nez Perce County, Idaho was added as the Nez Perce Snake River Archaeological District to the National Register in 1978.

References

Archaeological sites on the National Register of Historic Places in Idaho
Archaeological sites on the National Register of Historic Places in Washington (state)
Geography of Asotin County, Washington
Geography of Nez Perce County, Idaho
Snake River
Nez Perce tribe
Historic districts on the National Register of Historic Places in Idaho
Historic districts on the National Register of Historic Places in Washington (state)
National Register of Historic Places in Nez Perce County, Idaho
National Register of Historic Places in Asotin County, Washington